This is a list of members of the Western Australian Legislative Council from 27 July 1896 to 9 May 1898. The chamber had 21 seats made up of seven provinces each electing three members, on a system of rotation whereby one-third of the members would retire at each biennial election. The Constitution Act Amendment Act 1896, which passed after the 1896 Council election, created a new seat of North-East Province, which had its inaugural election on 29 June 1897 with terms expiring in 1904, 1902 and 1900.

Notes
  On 28 April 1897, Stephen Henry Parker (Metropolitan Province) resigned, and a by-election was held on 28 May 1897, at which George Randell was elected to fill the remainder of the term.

Sources
 
 

Members of Western Australian parliaments by term